The 14th Annual Puteri Indonesia (sometimes called Miss Indonesia Universe) Pageant, was held in Teater Tanah Airku, Taman Mini Indonesia Indah, Jakarta, Indonesia on Friday, October 9, 2009. Zivanna Letisha Siregar, Puteri Indonesia 2008 from Jakarta Special Capital Region 6 crowned her successor at the end of this event. About 38 contestants from 33 provinces competed for the title on the pageant that broadcast live on Indosiar and live streaming on selebtv.com and kompastv.com. Previously, Puteri Indonesia 2009 finalists underwent a quarantine period, which ran from 28 Sept – October 8, 2009, at Hotel Nikko Jakarta. The Grand Final of Puteri Indonesia 2009 was attended by Miss Universe 2009 Stefania Fernandez. The winner of Puteri Indonesia 2009 was Qory Sandioriva, and she represented Indonesia in Miss Universe 2010, Zukhriatul Hafizah will represent Indonesia in Miss International 2010.

Results
The Crowns of Puteri Indonesia Title Holders
 Puteri Indonesia 2009 (Miss Universe Indonesia 2009) 
  Puteri Indonesia Lingkungan 2009 (Miss International Indonesia 2009)
 Puteri Indonesia Pariwisata 2009 (Puteri Indonesia 2009 Runner-up)

Contestants
38 delegates have been selected.

Replacements
 Papua: Marcelina D Rahawarin actually was crowned Puteri Indonesia Papua 2009 on June 1, 2009. But she was replaced by 1st runner up Puteri Indonesia Papua 2009 Dela Pria Silvia Werinussa.

References

External links

Official Site
 Official Puteri Indonesia Official Website
 Official Miss Universe Official Website
 Miss International Official Website
 Official Miss Supranational Official Website

2009
2009 in Indonesia
2009 beauty pageants